Cyrtopodion medogense is a species of gecko, a lizard in the family Gekkonidae. The species is endemic to western China.

Geographic range
C. medogense is found in the Tibet Autonomous Region of China.

Reproduction
C. medogense is oviparous.

References

Further reading
Rösler, Herbert (2000), "Kommentierte Liste der rezent, subrezent und fossil bekannten Geckotaxa (Reptilia: Gekkonomorpha) ". Gekkota 2: 28-153. (Cyrtopodion medogensis, new combination, p. 74). (in German).
Zhao Ermi, Li Shengquan (1987). "A new lizard of Tenuidactylus and a new Tibetan snake record of Amphiesma ". Acta Herpetologica Sinica 6 (1): 48-51. (Tenuidactylus medogensis, new species). (in Chinese, with an abstract in English).

Cyrtopodion
Reptiles described in 1987
Taxa named by Zhao Ermi